Pudian Road station is the name of two different stations on the Shanghai Metro:

 Pudian Road station (line 4)
 Pudian Road station (line 6)